Kaman Keshi (also Romanized as Kamān Keshī) is a village in Balyan Rural District, in the Central District of Kazerun County, Fars Province, Iran. At the 2006 census, its population was 251, in 44 families.

References 

Populated places in Kazerun County